Folehavegård is an 18th-century farmhouse in Hørsholm, Denmark. It has been owned by Karen Blixen's father Wilhelm Dinesen, as well as her younger sister Ellen Dahl (née Dinesen), and was owned by the family for more than a hundred years. The main building, barn and stable are listed. Much of the land has been sold off. The remaining 35 hectares consist mostly of open farmland but adjoins the woodlands Folehaveskoven and Rungsted Hegn.

History
 
The property was originally a farm under Hørsholm Manor but it was sold off to the naval officer Conrad von Schindel in 1759. He had been stationed in the Mediterranean as commander of the frigate Dokken in 1761–63 where he negotiated a trade treaty with Tunesia. Schindel initially named the estate Christinegaard but renamed it Folehavegård after a major rebuilding of the house. He owned it until 1788.

 
Wilhelm Dinesen, Karen Blixen's father, acquired Folehavegård in 1879. He renovated the buildings and introduced various improvements. Dinesen was also the owner of Rungstedlund and Rungstedgård.

Mary Bess Westenholz, a sister of Karen Blixen's mother, lived at Folehavegård from 1881 until her death in 1947. In 1909, she stormed the Danish Rigsdagen and gave a speech to the all-male politicians.

In 1920, Hørsholm Municipality purchased a large portion of land from Folehavegård and used tp redevelop it with new housing. In 1944, Hørsholm acquired additional land, this time just under 20 hectares, which was also redeveloped.

The grounds
The estate covers approximately 35 hectares. It consists mostly of open farmland but a marshland, Slettemose, is located in its northern part. The estate was subject to a voluntary but binding conservation in 1944.

List of owners
 (1759-1786) Conrad von Schindel
 (1786-1789) Ulrich Lodberg
 (1789-1791) Johan Leonhard Fix
 (1791-1794) Jacob Brønnum Scavenius
 (1794-1798) Frederik Claesson
 (1798-1821) Paulin-Philippe-Henri de Dompierre de Jonquières
 (1821-1824) A. Christian Christensen
 (1824-1834) Johan Frederik Vilhelm Vally
 (1834-1851) Gottlieb Frederik von Wildenradt
 (1851-1866) Aron Nathan David
 (1866-1869) Harald David
 (1869-1871) Frederik Horsens Block
 (1871-1879) Carl Christian Brøchner
 (1879-1895) Wilhelm Dinesen
 (1895-1932) Ingeborg Dinesen
 (1932-1958) Ellen Dahl née Dinesen
 (1958-2000) Anne Kopp née Dinesen
 (2000-2010) Anders Kopp / Henrik Kopp / Niels Kopp
 (2010-) Mikael Lunøe / Lotte Bønnelycke

See also
 Listed buildings in Hørsholm Municipality

References

External links
 Wilhelm Dinesen in Hørsholm

Houses in Hørsholm Municipality
Listed buildings and structures in Hørsholm Municipality
Buildings and structures in Denmark associated with the Dinesen family